Piatra Albă may refer to:

 Piatra Albă, a village in Mileştii Mici Commune, Ialoveni district, Moldova
 Piatra Albă, a village in Odăile Commune, Buzău County, Romania